Page One Records, established in 1966, was the UK independent record label, owned by the producer/manager, Larry Page.

They were involved in a court case in July 1967 with The Troggs.

The label, which was co-founded by Page and Dick James, released hits from The Troggs, Vanity Fare and Plastic Penny, as well as numerous failed attempts by Page himself to obtain his own hit record. In the US, the label was distributed by Bell Records.

As the label faded, Page went on to found Penny Farthing Records.

See also
 Lists of record labels

References

External links
 Incomplete, but expansive, list of singles issued on Page One Records

Defunct record labels of the United Kingdom
Rock record labels
Pop record labels